James Rees (1802–1885) was an American author, playwright, and editor.

Biography
Rees was born in Norristown, Pennsylvania. He worked as a salesman, and as a clerk for the United States Post Office in Philadelphia, Pennsylvania.

Rees was co-editor of the Mechanics' Free Press, 1831; and editor of The Dramatic Mirror, 1842; and of The Philanthropist, 1854. He was closely involved with the Home Missionary Society of the City and County of Philadelphia, a Christian evangelist organization.

In 1849 he published the short story "A Christmas Legend", containing the first mention of Mrs. Santa Claus.

He and his wife Anna were the parents of four children, the first two of whom were born in their mother's home state of Louisiana.

Bibliography
Books
 The Beauties of the Hon. Daniel Webster; Selected and arranged, with a critical essay on his genius and writings, 1839.
 The Dramatic Authors of America, 1842.
 Mysteries of City Life; or, Leaves from the World's Book, 1849.
 The Tinker Spy: A Romance of the Revolution, 1855.
 Foot-Prints from a Letter Carrier; or, A History of the World's Correspondence, 1866.
 The Life of Edwin Forrest, 1874.
 Shakespeare and the Bible, 1875.

Plays
 The Headsman
 Washington at Valley Forge
 Changes
 Marion
 Pat Lyon
 Anthony Wayne

References

Further reading
 "James Rees", in Allibone's Critical Dictionary of English Literature and British and American Authors, vol. II, p. 1761.
 "James Rees", in Dictionary of American Biography, p. 761.
 "James Rees", in A Supplement to Allibone's Critical Dictionary of English Literature, vol. II, p. 1269.
 "James Rees", in A Dictionary of American Authors, 1904, p. 548.

1802 births
1885 deaths
Writers from Philadelphia
19th-century American dramatists and playwrights